Destination Friendship is the fourth studio album by American recording artist Leslie Hall, released on December 1, 2011 via Hefty Hideaway. It was supplemented by the singles "Hydrate Jirate", "Blame the Booty", which was released as a 7" vinyl the day of the album's release, and "You're Not Taken?".

Composition
Musically, Destination Friendship is a pop album that incorporates elements of dubstep, trance, and electronic music. It musically resembles the works of pop artists at the time, namely Britney Spears, Kesha, and Katy Perry. The album opens with "Hydrate Jirate," an electropop, techno, and dance track that talks about needing to be hydrated during a party. Its composition was compared to that of Kesha for its use of auto-tune, electro-twinged synthesizers, and techno chorus. This is followed up by the europop and J-pop song "Power Cuddle." "Crazy Now" is an electro pop rock song about the protagonist discovering their partner is "crazy." The second single, "You're Not Taken?" is described as an 80's inspired synthpop song describing the protagonist's infatuation with a lover, wondering why they are not taken. "Here to Win" is an R&B-licked electropop and dance song that incorporate dance beats, electro-twinged synthesizers, and fast speed rapping.

"Lonely Waltz" is a hip hop and EDM song that emphasizes on Hall's rapping and minimalistic, futuristic EDM drum machines and beats. "What We're Eating," the most different song on the track, is a comedic country song that uses Hall's vocals from the dance tracks. "No Pants Policy" is an electro song that talks about not wearing pants while dancing at a party. "Purchase One" is a hi-NRG inspired electro house song that incorporates Hall's rapping. The album closes with electro-dance remixes of two of Hall's previous songs "Tight Pants/Body Rolls" and "Blame the Booty."

Promotion

Tour
Leslie and the LY's toured to promote Destination Friendship in 2012. The tour kicked off with a 7" vinyl release show. She uploaded a preview of the tour to her YouTube channel on February 8, 2012. The group also made an appearance on MTN's Freaky Deeky where they performed "Power Cuddle" and "She's Got Pants."

Singles
 "Hydrate Jirate" was uploaded to Hall's main channel as the lead single on May 8, 2011.
 The remix of "Blame the Booty" was released on December 1, 2011 as the second single from the album.
 "You're Not Taken" was released on May 8, 2012 as the third and final single promoting Destination Friendship.

Other songs
 The album's second song, "Power Cuddle" was used as a promotional tool to promote the album in early 2011.
 "Hydrate Jirate" was uploaded to Hall's main channel on May 8, 2011.
 Another song entitled "She's Got Pants" was used as a promotional tool. Unlike "Power Cuddle," it did not make the final album.
 The song "No Pants Policy" was remixed by Titus Jones and released as a single of the remix album Songs in the Key of Gold. Making the remixed version of the song become one of Leslie's most successful singles.

Critical reception 
Lan Truong of Bust Magazine gave the album a positive review, writing that "Hall’s distinctive style adds humor to her sexual lyrics," and wrote that the album "clings to irony rather than heartfelt contemplations throughout." Truong finished the review by writing "if you’re looking for laughs and a dance-floor jam, Hall is your girl."

Track listing

Personnel 
Taken from Leslie Hall's website.
 Leslie Hall - lead vocals, songwriting, producer
 Ramona Muse - songwriting
 Kate Kennedy - producer
 Cassidy Hall - backing vocals

Release history

References

2011 albums
Leslie Hall albums